is a private university in the city of Kitakyushu in Fukuoka Prefecture, Japan. It was established in 1967.

External links
 Official website 

Educational institutions established in 1967
Private universities and colleges in Japan
Universities and colleges in Fukuoka Prefecture
Engineering universities and colleges in Japan